Sérgio Ricardo de Jesus Vertello known as Sérgio or Serjão (big Sérgio) (born 19 September 1975 in São Paulo) is a former Brazilian footballer.

He signed a six-month contract with Vila Nova in January 2006.

Club statistics

External links

 CBF 

Brazilian footballers
Brazilian expatriate footballers
Clube Atlético Juventus players
Albirex Niigata players
Avispa Fukuoka players
Ituano FC players
CR Vasco da Gama players
MSV Duisburg players
Vila Nova Futebol Clube players
J2 League players
2. Bundesliga players
Expatriate footballers in Japan
Expatriate footballers in Germany
Association football defenders
Footballers from São Paulo
1975 births
Living people